This is the results breakdown of the local elections held in the Basque Country on 8 May 1983. The following tables show detailed results in the autonomous community's most populous municipalities, sorted alphabetically.

Overall

City control
The following table lists party control in the most populous municipalities, including provincial capitals (shown in bold). Gains for a party are displayed with the cell's background shaded in that party's colour.

Municipalities

Baracaldo
Population: 118,615

Basauri
Population: 52,554

Bilbao
Population: 433,115

Donostia-San Sebastián
Population: 172,303

Getxo
Population: 67,793

Irún
Population: 53,334

Portugalete
Population: 58,071

Rentería
Population: 46,496

Santurce Antiguo
Population: 53,919

Vitoria-Gasteiz
Population: 189,533

Juntas Generales

References

Basque Country
1983